Dowleswaram is a part of Greater Rajamahendravaram Municipal Corporation (GRMC). It also forms a part of Godavari Urban Development Authority.

Landmarks 

Sir Arthur Cotton built the Dowleswaram Barrage across the Godavari in Dowleswaram. In memory of him, the Sir Arthur Cotton Museum, where projects relating to irrigation works are displayed, was named in his honour.

References

Rajahmundry